Dans l'eau qui fait des bulles is a French comedy film from 1961, directed by Maurice Delbez, written by Marcel Prêtre, starring Louis de Funès. In France the film is also known under the title "Le garde-champêtre mène l'enquête" (alternative title); other titles: "Un cadavere in fuga" (Italy), "Louis, die Schnatterschnauze" (West Germany), "Louis, lass die Leiche liegen" (West Germany). The scenario was written on the basis of "Les Pittuiti's" of Michel Duran.

Cast 
 Louis de Funès as Paul Ernzer, the fisher who withdraws the body
 Marthe Mercadier as Georgette Ernzer, wife of Paul
 Pierre Dudan as Charles Donadi
 Philippe Lemaire as Heinrich, le convoyeur
 Jacques Castelot as Baumann, the trafficker
 Claudine Coster as Eléna, the teacher of Baumann
 Pierre Doris as Le boy-scout camionneur
 Olivier Hussenot as the commissioner Guillaume
 Maria Riquelme as Arlette Preminger
 Serge Davri as Le vagabond
 Jacques Dufilho as Alphonse, the gravedigger
 Philippe Clay as the storyteller and the voice of dying (Jean-Louis Preminger)
 Max Elloy as a fisher

References

External links 
 
 Dans l’eau qui fait des bulles (1961) at the Films de France
 Interview de Maurice Delbez donnée en 2009 à propos du film Dans l'eau qui fait des bulles

1961 films
French comedy films
1960s French-language films
French black-and-white films
Films directed by Maurice Delbez
1960s French films